Events in the year 2003 in Ukraine.

Incumbents 

 President: Leonid Kuchma
 Prime Minister: Viktor Yanukovych

Events 

 24 December – The Treaty Between the Russian Federation and Ukraine on Cooperation in the Use of the Sea of Azov and the Kerch Strait is signed by Ukrainian President Leonid Kuchma and Russian President Vladimir Putin.

Deaths 

Vasyl Barka
Oleksandr Ivanovych Bilash
Ivan Margitych
Liuboslav Hutsaliuk

References 

 
Ukraine
Ukraine
2000s in Ukraine
Years of the 21st century in Ukraine